Paper Tongues is an American alternative rock band from Charlotte, North Carolina. The band currently consists of Aswan North (lead vocals) and Daniel Santell (bass guitar).  Their sound is described as fusing rock n' roll melodies with beats, and elements of sound. Their debut album was released on March 30, 2010.

History

Beginnings, debut album (2007–2012)
The group formed in 2007 in Charlotte, North Carolina, when a few musicians with very different musical backgrounds met in Charlotte and ultimately decided to form a band. Including originally, Luke Hill a drummer from Fort Worth, TX who helped popularize the band locally with his passionate playing style. After meeting  producer Brian West, and being invited to Los Angeles to work with him, Paper Tongues front-man Aswan North had a chance encounter with legendary musician-producer Randy Jackson in an L.A. restaurant, Jackson soon became the manager of the band.

Since these events, Paper Tongues has toured with bands such as Jet, Switchfoot, Our Lady Peace, Flyleaf, Linkin Park, etc., as well as co-headlined their own tour with the Neon Trees, Civil Twilight, & the Crash Kings. Paper Tongues has also opened a Vegas show for Cage the Elephant & Muse.  They have also appeared on George Lopez's Lopez Tonight and Late Night with Jimmy Fallon.

Their song "Get Higher" is featured on the 2012 season of Fox Television's hit show, "American Idol"

Their song "Soul" is featured on Halogen TV's Fall 2010 promo video.

On Saturday February 12, 2011 they served as the headliners for WFLZ's popular "Meet Ball" concert in Tampa, FL.

They opened for Linkin Park during the A Thousand Suns Tour for their shows in Dallas, Houston, and Phoenix.

Rockmen Music Group, Crowd Surfing EP (2012–2013)
On May 11, 2012 their single "Amen" was released to Tampa radio stations WSUN and WHPT (via Bubba the Love Sponge), as well as Charlotte station WEND.

On May 30, 2012 Paper Tongues posted on Twitter saying their new song "who I am" was currently in the mixing stages.

On June 9, 2012 Paper Tongues posted on Facebook stating "Just finished our first month in the studio and met our goal of completing a 5 song ep! Can't wait for you all to hear it!!!! Thanks for all the support." Confirming this is in fact an ep and not a full-length album in the progress, however does not deny possibilities of a second full length being on the horizon.

Second full-length album (2013–present)
Paper Tongues confirmed full length in the works via Twitter "Breakfast at Zada Jane's, now headed to the studio to work on preproduction for the full length. Back to work!!!"

Discography

Studio albums
Paper Tongues (March 30, 2010), (No. 110 Billboard 200)

EPs
Ride to California EP (2009)
Crowd Surfing EP (2012) Rockmen Music Group

Singles

References

External links
Paper Tongues, "Paper Tongues" by Billboard
"Soul" featured in Halogen TV's promo video on YouTube
 UpVenue interview with Paper Tongues

Alternative rock groups from North Carolina
Culture of Charlotte, North Carolina
Musical groups established in 2007